William Richard Brenzel (March 3, 1910 – June 12, 1979) was a Major League Baseball catcher who played three seasons for the Pittsburgh Pirates and Cleveland Indians where he earned a reputation for his quick wit and his slow feet. After his playing career ended, he was a longtime scout for the Los Angeles Dodgers.

External links

1910 births
1979 deaths
Major League Baseball catchers
Pittsburgh Pirates players
Cleveland Indians players
Brooklyn Dodgers scouts
Los Angeles Dodgers scouts
St. Louis Cardinals scouts
Baseball players from Oakland, California
Minor league baseball managers
Twin Falls Bruins players
Mission Bells players
Idaho Falls Spuds players
Mission Reds players
Newark Bears (IL) players
San Francisco Seals (baseball) players
Spokane Indians managers
Kansas City Blues (baseball) players
Milwaukee Brewers (minor league) players
Hollywood Stars players
Pocatello Cardinals players